"Girls Lie Too" is a song written by Tim Nichols, Kelley Lovelace and Connie Harrington, and recorded by Canadian country music singer Terri Clark.  It was released in April 2004 as the first single from her Greatest Hits 1994-2004 compilation album.  The song reached the top of the Billboard Hot Country Singles & Tracks chart on September 11, becoming Clark's second and most recent number one single in the United States.

Content
The narrator addresses several lies that women tend to tell regarding their expectations of their significant others. For example, it doesn't matter how much money they make, what car they drive, or how much they weigh; and it's interesting to listen to them brag about golf, hunting, and getting wings at Hooters.

Critical reception
Deborah Evans Price, of Billboard magazine reviewed the song favorably, saying that "a clever lyric combined with a spirited performance make this highly compatible with previous Clark hits." She goes on to say that the song "boasts a lively tempo that makes it great summer radio fare, and the lyric will make listeners chuckle."

Music video
The music video shows a woman, played by LaTresa Smith with Pirates of the Caribbean character Jack Sparrow as her dream lover, played by video director Shaun Silva. At the end, she calls him "Johnny" in bed. The video also features a cameo appearance by Wayne Newton.

Chart performance
"Girls Lie Too" debuted at number 53 on the U.S. Billboard Hot Country Singles & Tracks for the week of April 24, 2004.

Year-end charts

References

2004 singles
Terri Clark songs
Songs written by Kelley Lovelace
Songs written by Tim Nichols
Music videos directed by Shaun Silva
Song recordings produced by Byron Gallimore
Mercury Records singles
Songs written by Connie Harrington
2004 songs